Kishan Kala (born 5 February 1965) is an Indian cricketer. He played in 45 first-class and 8 List A matches from 1982/83 to 1993/94.

See also
 List of Uttar Pradesh cricketers

References

External links
 

1965 births
Living people
Indian cricketers
Railways cricketers
Uttar Pradesh cricketers
Cricketers from Allahabad